Filipp Vitalyevich Postnikov (born 10 April 1989) is a former Russian football midfielder.

Club career
He played in the Russian Football National League for FC Khimik Dzerzhinsk in 2014.

External links
 Career summary by sportbox.ru
 
 
 

1989 births
Footballers from Saint Petersburg
Living people
Russian footballers
Association football midfielders
FC Zenit Saint Petersburg players
FC Myllypuro players
FC Dynamo Kirov players
FC Khimik Dzerzhinsk players
FC Vitebsk players
Belarusian Premier League players
Russian expatriate footballers
Expatriate footballers in Finland
Expatriate footballers in Belarus